Ash Grove Township may refer to:

 Ash Grove Township, Iroquois County, Illinois
 Ash Grove Township, Shelby County, Illinois
 Ash Grove Township, Franklin County, Nebraska

See also
 Ash Grove (disambiguation)

Township name disambiguation pages